Tre'Shawn Thurman (born December 15, 1995) is an American professional basketball player for Filou Oostende of the BNXT League. He played college basketball for the Nevada Wolf Pack and the Omaha Mavericks.

Early life and high school career
Thurman was born in San Diego, California but grew up in Omaha, Nebraska. He attended Omaha Central High School, which was nationally ranked. He led the team to a state title and earned all-state honors as a senior, averaging 16.6 points and 7.9 rebounds per game.

College career
As a freshman at Omaha, Thurman averaged 9.5 points and 5.6 rebounds per game. Thurman averaged 13.9 points and 6.7 rebounds per game as a sophomore. He posted 13.8 points and 7.8 rebounds per game as a junior and was named to the Summit League Honorable Mention Team.  Omaha finished 18-14 in his junior season, and Thurman had 21 points and eight rebounds in the Summit League Tournament final, where the Mavericks lost to South Dakota State, 79-77. After the season, Thurman decided to transfer for his final season of eligibility, considering offers from Drake and Wright State before settling on Nevada. As a senior at Nevada, Thurman averaged 8.2 points, 5.8 rebounds, 1.7 assists and 1.1 steals per game. He made 29 starts and shot 49.8 percent from the floor and 26.4 percent from behind the arc.

Professional career
After going undrafted in the 2019 NBA draft, Thurman participated in the G League Player Invitational. On October 18, 2019, Thurman signed with the Detroit Pistons. He was named to the roster of the Pistons’ NBA G League affiliate, the Grand Rapids Drive. Thurman averaged 7.6 points, 3.4 rebounds and 1.2 assists per game. In 2021, Thurman joined Omaha's Finest of The Basketball League. He sustained an injury in April, ending his season. Thurman joined the Stockton Kings in October 2021.

On August 10, 2022, he signed with Filou Oostende of the BNXT League.

References

External links
Nevada Wolf Pack bio

1995 births
Living people
American men's basketball players
Basketball players from Nebraska
Basketball players from San Diego
BC Oostende players
Grand Rapids Drive players
Nevada Wolf Pack men's basketball players
Omaha Central High School alumni
Omaha Mavericks men's basketball players
Small forwards
Sportspeople from Omaha, Nebraska
Stockton Kings players
United States men's national basketball team players